The Dr. Edgar Everett Dean House is a historic house located at 81 Green Street in Brockton, Massachusetts.

Description and history 
The 3-story wood-frame house was built in 1884 for Doctor Edgar Everett Dean, a prominent local physician. The Queen Anne Victorian is one of the few surviving residential designs of the locally prominent architect Wesley Lyng Minor, whose credits also include Brockton City Hall. From 1939 to 1993, the building was home to the Hall Funeral Home.

The house was listed on the National Register of Historic Places in 1978.

See also
National Register of Historic Places listings in Plymouth County, Massachusetts

References

Houses in Brockton, Massachusetts
National Register of Historic Places in Plymouth County, Massachusetts
Houses on the National Register of Historic Places in Plymouth County, Massachusetts
Queen Anne architecture in Massachusetts
Houses completed in 1884